The Skyline Conference was a college athletic conference based in the Western United States that was active from December 1937 to June 1962. The conference's formal name was the Mountain States Athletic Conference, although it was also known as the Mountain States Conference along with informal but popular nicknames. It is unrelated to the contemporary Skyline Conference that is active in NCAA Division III in the New York City area.

History
The conference began operating on December 3, 1937 when most of the larger schools in the Rocky Mountain Athletic Conference left to form a new conference. The seven charter members of the conference were: BYU, Colorado, Colorado A&M (now Colorado State), Denver, Utah, Utah State, and Wyoming. At the time of formation, the formal name of Mountain States Athletic Conference was adopted, although newspapers were already calling it the Big Seven at that time. The conference became popularly known as the Skyline Conference or Skyline Six after Colorado left in 1947. Colorado joined the Missouri Valley Intercollegiate Athletic Association (MVIAA), informally known as the Big Six Conference, which took over the Big Seven name and would later become the Big Eight Conference.

The conference became known as the Skyline Eight after New Mexico and Montana joined in 1951. The conference officially dissolved as of July 1, 1962, after four of its members (BYU, New Mexico, Utah, and Wyoming) departed to form the Western Athletic Conference (WAC). Montana operated as an independent for one football season in 1962 until the formation of the Big Sky Conference in 1963.  Colorado State became independent until it joined the WAC in 1968. Utah State operated as an independent for fifteen seasons, until it joined the Pacific Coast Athletic Association (later named the Big West Conference) in 1977.

The conference first had a full-time commissioner in 1949, appointing Dick Romney, who had led the Utah State Aggies football program since 1919. He was succeeded in August 1960 by Paul Brechler, who had been athletic director at the University of Iowa. Brechler served as commissioner until the conference disbanded, and became the first commissioner of the WAC.

Member schools

Final members

Notes

Former members

Membership timeline

Football champions

1938 Utah
1939 Colorado
1940 Utah
1941 Utah
1942 Utah and Colorado
1943 Colorado
1944 Colorado
1945 Denver
1946 Denver and Utah State
1947 Utah
1948 Utah
1949 Wyoming
1950 Wyoming
1951 Utah
1952 Utah
1953 Utah
1954 Denver
1955 Colorado A&M
1956 Wyoming
1957 Utah
1958 Wyoming
1959 Wyoming
1960 Wyoming and Utah State
1961 Wyoming and Utah State

See also
 List of Skyline Conference (1938–1962) football standings
 List of defunct college football conferences

References

External links
 

 
Sports in the Western United States
1938 establishments in the United States
1962 disestablishments in the United States